Veleta may refer to:
 Veleta (Sierra Nevada), a mountain in Spain
Veleta, song on the album Lucero